The N3 is a national route in South Africa that connects Johannesburg and Durban, respectively South Africa's largest and third-largest cities. Johannesburg is the financial and commercial heartland of South Africa, while Durban is South Africa's key port and one of the busiest ports in the Southern Hemisphere and is also a holiday destination.  Durban is the port through which Johannesburg imports and exports most of its goods. As a result, the N3 is a very busy highway and has a high volume of traffic.

Route
The N3 is divided into 12 sections, starting with section 1 in Durban and ending with section 12 in Johannesburg. Between the two cities, the route passes the following towns and cities: Cato Ridge, Pietermaritzburg, Howick, Mooi River, Estcourt, Ladysmith, Van Reenen, Harrismith, Warden, Villiers, Heidelberg and Germiston. It no longer passes through most of these towns, as bypasses have been built around all of them (the N3 does not pass through any city centres). The last bypass that was built was around the town of Warden.

KwaZulu-Natal

The N3 begins in the Durban Central Business District at Pine Street and Commercial Road as a dual-carriageway freeway and heads west, passing through Berea and Mayville before intersecting with the N2 Highway (Durban Outer Ring Road) at the EB Cloete Interchange. It then heads through Westville before bypassing the south of Pinetown. The route is then tolled at Mariannhill as it leaves the urban area, and then heads towards Cato Ridge. From Cato Ridge, the route passes Camperdown before turning towards the northwest and heading towards Pietermaritzburg, the provincial capital.

After bypassing Pietermaritzburg Central to the east and north, the N3 heads up a steep incline, whereby the road ascends from an altitude of 600m to an altitude of 1,100m in a northerly direction, known as Town Hill before passing near Hilton and Howick; a road to the Southern Drakensberg (the R617) leaves the N3 at Howick. The route then becomes picturesque as it heads through the KwaZulu-Natal Midlands, passing through Mooi River (where another toll is located) before heading to Estcourt. Just past Estcourt, access to the Central and Northern Drakensberg via the R74 is provided, before the N3 heads in the direction of Ladysmith. The N3 bypasses Ladysmith to the west, with the N11 providing access to Ladysmith Central. The N3 from Cedara (in-between Hilton and Howick) to Heidelberg in Gauteng is managed by a private concessionaire, the N3 Toll Concession.

A few kilometres after the N11 interchange, the N3 is tolled once again; the dual-carriageway freeway also ending at this point. From here, the N3 ascends the South African plateau via Van Reenen's Pass; at the top of the pass, the N3 crosses into the Free State.

Free State
After crossing into the Free State, the N3 heads to Harrismith, where the N5 leaves it (providing a route to Bloemfontein and Cape Town via the N1). The N3 then heads to the north, and passes the town of Warden and heads towards Villiers, where a toll is located right before the R26 Villiers off-ramp (Wilge Toll Plaza). Immediately after Villers, the N3 crosses the Vaal River and enters Mpumalanga. Here, it becomes a dual carriageway again and remains one for its remainder.

Mpumalanga
The N3 then heads through the south-western tip of Mpumalanga in the direction of Heidelberg. Soon after crossing the Vaal River,  the N3 meets the R54 road, which provides access to Vereeniging in the west. After 23 km, the N3 bypasses Grootvlei. Just before reaching Heidelberg, the N3 has its last tollgate (De Hoek Toll Plaza); this also marks the point where the N3 crosses into Gauteng.

Gauteng
The N3 then continues north & bypasses Heidelberg before heading towards Johannesburg. The section maintained by the N3 Toll Concession ends at the R23 interchange south of the Heidelberg town centre.

On approaching Johannesburg, the N3 passes the townships of Katlehong and Vosloorus before bypassing Alberton. At the R554/R103 (Old Barn Road; Heidelberg Road) off-ramp in Alberton, the N3 becomes an e-toll Highway (with open road tolling) and remains as one for its remainder.

Next, the N3 meets the N17 Highway at the Rand Airport Interchange near Rand Airport (each ramp onto the N17 has a tollgate). Almost immediately afterwards, the N12 (the Southern Bypass portion of the Johannesburg Ring Road) merges with the N3 at the Elands Interchange, with the N3 then becoming the Eastern Bypass portion of the Johannesburg Ring Road. From here, it follows much of the borderline between the City of Johannesburg and the City of Ekurhuleni.

The N3/N12 concurrency proceeds northwards from the Elands Interchange and bypasses the city of Germiston (Capital of Ekurhuleni) to the west. It reaches the Geldenhuys Interchange, where it forms an interchange with the M2 Highway (Francois Oberholzer Freeway), which provides access to the Johannesburg CBD in the west and the Germiston CBD in the east.

Next, the N3/N12 heads to Bedfordview, where the N12 leaves the N3 at the George Bizos Interchange (previously known as the Gillooly's Interchange; just east of the Eastgate Shopping Centre), joins the R24 Highway eastwards and provides access to the East Rand and O. R. Tambo International Airport. This interchange with the R24 is purported to be the busiest interchange in the Southern Hemisphere.

From here, the N3 continues going northwards as the Johannesburg Eastern Bypass and bypasses Edenvale and Alexandra before terminating at the Buccleuch Interchange just south of Midrand and north of Sandton, which is the point at which the N3, N1 and M1 converge.

Alternative route

Where the N3 has been realigned, the old alignment has been designated R103. The R103 exists in three sections: between Durban and Ladysmith, between Warden and Villiers, and between Heidelberg and Johannesburg. The only exception is within Durban itself, where most of the old N3 alignment is designated as the M13 instead of having the usual R103 designation; the R103 diverges from the M13 in Gillitts just outside Durban.

The R103 is typically used to avoid the toll plazas on the N3, with one notable exception being the Tugela East Toll Plaza located on the R103 itself where the R103 and N3 meet north of Ladysmith.

Prior to the redesignation of the National Route numbers in 1971, the N3 moved east at Heidelberg and passed through the towns of Standerton, Volksrust and Newcastle via Laing's Nek Pass, before joining the present alignment at Ladysmith. This route now designated R23 between Heidelberg and Volksrust and N11 thereafter to Ladysmith remains an alternative to the N3.

Dual carriageway sections
Following the opening of the motorway section in December 2001 between Heidelberg and Villiers, the N3 now has at least two lanes in each direction for its entire length between Johannesburg and Durban. The section between Johannesburg and Villiers is dual carriageway motorway. Between Villiers and Warden the road is single carriageway motorway with two lanes in each direction. From Warden to Keeversfontein (Tugela Toll Plaza; Ladysmith) the road is no longer motorway but retains two lanes in each direction. Thereafter, the route to Durban is dual carriageway motorway. This last section from Ladysmith to Durban is the second longest motorway by route number (after the N1 between the Vaal River and Modimolle), but the longest motorway following one alignment in South Africa.

Proposed realignment

SANRAL proposed plans to re-route one section of the N3 between Keeversfontein (Tugela Toll Plaza) near Ladysmith, and the start of the tolled section near Warden, probably meeting the present alignment just south of Warden. This would involve the diversion of the road over De Beer's Pass, as opposed to Van Reenen's Pass. Not only would it reduce the route distance by 14 kilometres, but would have a lower gradient. Proponents of the new road argue that the existing Van Reenen's Pass is too steep for heavy trucks and exceeds the maximum gradient of 1:7 for an officially declared national road. This has caused a huge outcry among residents of Harrismith and Van Reenen, who rely on passing traffic to sustain businesses such as restaurants, petrol stations, and holiday rest places.

The N3 Toll Concession has stated that the De Beer's bypass will be required when daily traffic volumes reach 13,900 vehicles - the traffic volumes at Van Reenen as of 2008 is 11,000 vehicles, and based on projected increases in traffic volumes, the bypass would have needed to be operational by the end of 2014, with construction commencing in the second half of 2011. This proposed new routing of the N3 would also have a new toll plaza built on it near Warden.

In March 2017, it was decided by SANRAL that the construction of the De Beer's Pass Route will not continue.

Tolls
Most of the road is only usable upon the payment of toll. There are toll plazas at Mariannhill (Pinetown), Mooi River, Tugela (Ladysmith), Wilge (Villiers) and De Hoek (Heidelberg). As mentioned above, most of the toll plazas can be avoided by using the R103.

A sixth toll plaza would have been constructed south of Warden when the De Beer's bypass (mentioned above) would have been built.

Open road tolling of the northernmost part of the N3, from Black Reef Road (Old Barn Interchange; R554) to Buccleuch Interchange (N1 Interchange) in Gauteng, came into effect from December 2013 as the e-toll system. There are a number of electronic toll gantries located on this stretch, which each have their own prices charged to each type of vehicle (labelled on road signage as one approaches each gantry).

Moving light apparitions
A stretch of the N3 in the Free State is particularly known for moving light apparitions. A notable incident, reported as a UFO sighting, occurred on 8 May 2000 when a police inspector claimed to have observed an approaching UFO while travelling on the N3 freeway, 70 km north of Warden in the eastern Free State province. The orange, oval-shaped craft was fitted with two cupolas, one above and another below, and was wide enough to cover four lanes of the freeway. After a close approach the craft receded again.

Notable interchanges

References

 
National Roads in South Africa
Toll roads in South Africa
Transport in Durban
Highways in South Africa
Streets and roads of Johannesburg
Roads in South Africa
Paranormal places in South Africa